The following is a month by month timeline of the 2019–2020 Hong Kong protests.

Timeline